Bamyan is a district of Bamyan province in Afghanistan. In 2003, the population was put at 70,028, of which the majority group is Hazara while the Tajik is a minority group. New Zealand peace keepers operate in the district as well as most of Bamyan Province.

Villages in Bamyan District include `Ambar Samuch and more.

See also 
 Districts of Afghanistan
 Hazarajat

References

External links 
AIMS District Map
 https://whc.unesco.org/archive/advisory_body_evaluation/208rev.pdf

Districts of Bamyan Province
Hazarajat